The 2022 Rocky Mountain Athletic Conference football season was the season of college football played by the ten member schools of the Rocky Mountain Athletic Conference (RMAC) as part of the 2022 NCAA Division II football season.

The Colorado Mines Orediggers won the RMAC championship with a 9–2 record (9–0 against conference opponents), led the conference in both scoring offense (46.86 points per game) and scoring defense (18.64 points per game), and was ranked No. 10 in the final NCAA Division II rankings. The Orediggers' quarterback John Matocha was selected as the RMAC Offensive Player of the Year, and Brandon Moore of Colorado Mines was selected as the RMAC Coach of the Year. The team won in the first three rounds of the NCAA Division II playoffs and faces Shepherd in the semifinals on December 10.

The CSU Pueblo ThunderWolves finished in second place with an 8–4 overall record. CSU Pueblo defensive tacke Trey Botts was named RMAC Defensive Player of the Year.

Conference overview

Conference awards

Individual honors
 Offensive Player of the Year: John Matocha, Colorado Mines
 Defensive Player of the Year: Trey Botts, CSU Pueblo
 Special Teams Player of the Year: CJ Sims, New Mexico Highlands
 Offensive Freshman of the Year: Landon Walker, Colorado Mines
 Defensive Freshman of the Year: Cooper Brown, Black Hills State
 Coach of the Year: Brandon Moore, Colorado Mines

All-RMAC team
The following players were selected as first-team players on the 2022 All-RMAC football team.

Offense
 Quarterback - John Matocha, Colorado Mines
 Running backs - Michael Zeman, Colorado Mines; Josh Cummings, Western Colorado
 Wide receivers - Jeremiah Bridges, South Dakota Mines; Josh Johnston, Colorado Mines; CJ Sims,New Mexico Highlands
 Tight end - Dagan Rienks, Colorado Mesa
 Offensive line - Matt Armendariz, Colorado Mines; Sam Ambrogio, Black Hills State; Clayton Martin, Western Colorado; Mathyus Su’a, Western Colorado; Levi Johnson, Colorado Mines

Defense
 Cornerbacks - Mason Pierce, Colorado Mines; Eli Pittman, CSU Pueblo
 Safeties -  Daniel Bone, CSU Pueblo; Doodles Quinones, Black Hills State
 Inside linebackers - Kyante Christian, South Dakota Mines; Adrian Moreno, Colorado Mines
 Outside linebackers - Mack Minnehan, Colorado Mines; Luke Conilogue, CSU Pueblo
 Defensive tackles - Trey Botts, CSU Pueblo; Tayven Bray, Chadron State
 Defensive ends - Hunter O’Connor, Chadron State; Gavin Chaddock, South Dakota Mines

Special teams
 Kicker - Gunnar Jones, Chadron State
 Punter - Cole Riters, Western Colorado
 Kick returner - Victory David, Western Colorado
 Punt returner - CJ Sims, New Mexico Highlands

Teams

Colorado Mines

The 2022 Colorado Mines Orediggers football team represented the Colorado School of Mines in Golden, Colorado during the 2022 Rocky Mountain Athletic Conference (RMAC) football season. In their first year under head coach Brandon Moore, the Orediggers compiled an overall record of 13–3 with a mark of 9–0 against conference opponents, winning the RMAC championship.

Colorado Mines quarterback John Matocha was selected as the RMAC Offensive Player of the Year, and Brandon Moore was selected as the RMAC Coach of the Year.

CSU Pueblo

The 2022 CSU Pueblo ThunderWolves football team represented the Colorado State University Pueblo in Pueblo, Colorado, during the 2022 Rocky Mountain Athletic Conference (RMAC) football season. In their 15th year under head coach John Wristen, the ThunderWolves compiled an 8–4 record (7–2 against conference opponents) and finished second in the RMAC.

CSU Pueblo defensive tackle Trey Botts was selected as the RMAC Defensive Player of the Year.

Western Colorado

The 2022 Western Colorado Mountaineers football team represented the Western Colorado University in Gunnison, Colorado, during the 2022 Rocky Mountain Athletic Conference (RMAC) football season. In their 12th year under head coach Jas Baines, the Mountaineers compiled a 7–4 record (7–2 against conference opponents) and finished third in the RMAC.

South Dakota Mines

The 2022 South Dakota Mines Hardrockers football team represented the South Dakota School of Mines and Technology in Rapid City, South Dakota, during the 2022 Rocky Mountain Athletic Conference football season. In their third year under head coach Charlie Flohr, the Hardrockers compiled a 7–4 record (6–3 against RMAC opponents) and finished fourth in the RMAC.

Black Hills State

The 2022 Black Hills State Yellow Jackets football team represented Black Hills State University in Spearfish, South Dakota, during the 2022 Rocky Mountain Athletic Conference football season. In their third year under head coach Josh Breske, the Yellow Jackets compiled a 7–4 record (5–4 against RMAC opponents) and finished fifth in the RMAC.

Cooper Brown was selected as the RMAC Defensive Freshman of the Year.

Colorado Mesa

The 2022 Colorado Mesa Mavericks football team represented Colorado Mesa University in Grand Junction, Colorado, during the 2022 Rocky Mountain Athletic Conference football season. In their first year under head coach Miles Kochevar, the Mavericks compiled a 4–6 record (3–6 against RMAC opponents) and finished sixth in the RMAC.

New Mexico Highlands

The 2022 New Mexico Highlands Cowboys football team represented New Mexico Highlands University in Las Vegas, New Mexico, during the 2022 Rocky Mountain Athletic Conference football season. Led by first-year head coach Ron Hudson, the Mavericks compiled a 3–7 record (3–6 against RMAC opponents) and finished seventh in the RMAC.

New Mexico Highlands punt returner CJ Sims was selected as the RMAC Special Teams Player of the Year.

Chadron State

The 2022 Chadron State Eagles football team represented Chadron State College in Chadron, Nebraska, during the 2022 Rocky Mountain Athletic Conference (RMAC) football season. In their 11th season under head coach Jay Long, the Eagles compiled a 3–8 record (3–6 against conference opponents) and finished eighth in the RMAC.

Adams State

The 2022 Adams State Grizzlies football team represented Adams State University in Alamosa, Colorado, during the 2022 Rocky Mountain Athletic Conference (RMAC) football season. In their third year under head coach Jarrell Harrison, the Grizzlies compiled a 2–9 record (2–7 against conference opponents) and finished ninth in the RMAC.

Fort Lewis

The 2022 Fort Lewis Skyhawks football team represented Fort Lewis College in Durango, Colorado, during the 2022 Rocky Mountain Athletic Conference (RMAC) football season. Under head coach Johnny Cox, the Grizzlies compiled a 0–10 record (0–9) against conference opponents) and finished last in the RMAC. In July 2022, Spencer Brown was appointed as the team's new defensive coordinator. With Brown as defensive coordinator, the Skyhawks gave up an average of 60.7 points per game.

References